Dane Dukić (born 24 August 1981) is a Serbian former footballer who played as a midfielder.

Club career
Born in Novi Sad, Dukić spent his career playing with 3 clubs including OFK Bačka, ČSK Čelarevo and Radnički Šid. He started his career with OFK Bačka in the 2000–01 Serbian League Vojvodina season, making a debut against OFK Kikinda in August 2000, when he also scored a goal. Next year, Dukić moved to ČSK Čelarevo, where he stayed until the end of 2003. Returning in his home club, OFK Bačka, Dukić scored 20 goals in 100 Serbian League Vojvodina matches between 2004 and 2008. Dukić also played with Radnički Šid in next several seasons, returning in OFK Bačka in the meantime. As a regular player of OFK Bačka since 2012–13 season, Dukić progressed 3 league ranks for 4 seasons. After the 2015–16 season, Dukić made a promotion to the Serbian SuperLiga along with the club. On 28 January 2017, Dukić announced his retirement from professional football, but later joined lower league club Krila Krajine.

Honours
OFK Bačka
Vojvodina League West: 2012–13
Serbian League Vojvodina: 2013–14

References

External links
 
 
 

1981 births
Living people
Footballers from Novi Sad
Association football midfielders
Serbian footballers
OFK Bačka players
FK ČSK Čelarevo players
FK Radnički Šid players
Serbian First League players
Serbian SuperLiga players